The 2014 AFF U-19 Women's Championship was held from 16 August to 26 August 2014, hosted by Thailand. All games were played at the Rajamangala Stadium. For the first time it was held as an under-19 tournament.

Thailand beat Vietnam in the final after penalties.

Teams

Venue

Standings and Results
All times are Thailand Standard Time – UTC+07:00.

Group stage

Knockout stage

Third place play-off

Final

Winner

Goalscorers
16 goals
 Nilar Win

11 goals
 Lê Hoài Lương

9 goals
 Saowalak Pengngam

8 goals
 Passanan Thong-Im

5 goals

 Kay Zin Myint
 Sudarat Chuchuen
 Lê Thị Thùy Trang
 Hoàng Thị Mười

4 goals
 Jiraporn Mongkoldee

3 goals

 May Sabai Phoo
 Yun Me Me Lwin
 Panadda Siserm
 Lê Thị Hồng Tươi

2 goals

 Wai Zin Hnin
 Theint Ko Ko
 Sirintip Thongmai
 Nurul Khairiah Binte Azhar
 Nguyễn Kim Anh
 Nguyễn Thị Thùy Hương

1 goal

 Yu Per Khine
 Nur Faradila Binte Rafidi
 Sitianiwati Binte Rosielin
 Sojirat Pradisorn
 Kullasatree Jaiton
 Kanthika Choodet
 Oraya Sridarak
 Mutita Senkram
 Nguyễn Thị Minh Anh
 Bùi Thị Trang

Own goal
 Khin Pyae Lin (playing against Vietnam)

References

External links

AFF U-19 Women's Championship 2014

2014
2014 in Asian football
2014 in Thai football
2014 in Vietnamese football
2014 in Singaporean football
2014 in Burmese football
2014 in East Timorese sport
2014 in Thai women's sport
Champ
August 2014 sports events in Asia